Johann Justus Kahle (11 February 1668 in Helmstedt – c. 1731 in Clausthal-Zellerfeld) was a German organist and composer.

Life 
He was born, son of the baker Bathold Kahle, on 11 February 1668, and christened on 12 April 1668 in the church . Nothing is known of his childhood; and his name cannot be found in the records of the Academia Julia. He was first organist at St. Stephani, then he moved to be organist at Zellerfeld.

He is known today only through the discovery in the library in Ostrava of his church consecration cantatas which he composed on behalf of Otto Ludwig von Veltheim around 1704.

Works 
Four Psalm Cantatas for soprano and instruments for dedication of the Ostrava church:
 Wie lieblich sind deine Wohnungen, Herr Zebaoth (Psalm 84), cantata for soprano, 2 oboes, 2 violins and basso continuo
 Wie der Hirsch schreyet nach frischem Wasser (Psalm 42), cantata for soprano, 2 violins and basso continuo
 Ich hebe meine Augen auf zu den Bergen (Psalm 121), cantata for soprano, solo violin and basso continuo
 Jauchzet dem Herrn, alle Welt (Psalm 100), cantata for soprano, 2 oboes, 2 violins and basso continuo

Recordings
 Psalm 84 "Wie lieblich sind deine Wohnungen"; Psalm 42 "Wie der Hirsch schreit"; Psalm 121 "Ich hebe meine Augen auf"; Psalm 100 "Jauchzet dem Herrn alle Welt" + Joachim Pauli: Zions Trost; Der Tag ist hin, nun kömmt die Nacht. Maria Skiba, Collegio Halense, Christoph Schlütter, Querstand, DDD, 2010

References

External links
 Consecration in Ostrava
 Ostrava Church

17th-century German composers
18th-century German composers
German organists
German male organists
1668 births
1730s deaths
17th-century male musicians